2015 in women's road cycling is about the 2015 women's bicycle races ruled by the UCI and the 2015 UCI Women's Teams.

UCI Road World Rankings

Final ranking 2015.

World Championships

The World Road Championships is set to be held in Richmond, Virginia, United States.

UCI World Cup

Single day races (1.1 and 1.2)

† The clock symbol denotes a race which takes the form of a one-day time trial.

Stage races (2.1 and 2.2)

Cancelled Events

Championships

International Games

Continental Championships

UCI teams

The country designation of each team is determined by the country of registration of the largest number of its riders, and is not necessarily the country where the team is registered or based.\

References

 

Women's road cycling by year